Jikustik is a pop rock band formed in Yogyakarta, Indonesia in 1996. The group comprises vocalist Brian, guitarist Dadi, keyboardist Adhit and drummer Carlo.

Jikustik are known for their hit singles, such as "Seribu Tahun Lamanya", "Malam", "Setia", "Maaf", "Puisi" and "Pulanglah Padanya". The first album titled Seribu Tahun (One Thousand Years), released in 2000.

Discography

External links 
 Official site

Musical groups established in 1996
Indonesian pop music groups
1996 establishments in Indonesia